Yu Chang-jun (born 20 July 1981) is a South Korean diver. He competed in the men's 10 metre platform event at the 2000 Summer Olympics.

References

1981 births
Living people
South Korean male divers
Olympic divers of South Korea
Divers at the 2000 Summer Olympics
Place of birth missing (living people)
21st-century South Korean people